Jalan Hulu Langat (Selangor state route B52) is a major road in Selangor, Malaysia. The 10-km section of this road, which is known as Jalan Kawasan Perindustrian Hulu Langat (from Pekan Batu Sembilan (Bt-9) Cheras to Pekan Batu Empat Belas (Bt-14) Hulu Langat), is also commissioned as Industrial Federal Route 3210. When completed, it will also connect with the new East Klang Valley Expressway.

List of junctions

Roads in Selangor

References